Ludovico Scarfiotti (18 October 1933 – 8 June 1968) was a Formula One and sports car driver from Italy.  Just prior to entering Formula One, he won the 1963 24 Hours of Le Mans for Ferrari.  He later participated in 12 World Championship Formula One grands prix, and many non-championship races.  He won one World Championship race, and scored a total of 17 championship points. A motor sports competitor for a decade, Scarfiotti won the 1962 and 1965 European Hillclimb Championship. He was proclaimed Italy's best driver in both 1962 and 1965.

Early life
Scarfiotti was born in Turin. Scarfiotti was associated with cars from his youth. His grandfather was the first president and one of the nine founders of the Fiat automobile company.

Sports car competition

Scarfiotti competed in the 1,000 Kilometres de Paris sports car race in October 1962. He finished third with teammate Colin Davis. The event was won by Pedro Rodríguez and Ricardo Rodríguez driving a Ferrari. Partnered with Lorenzo Bandini, Scarfiotti was victorious in the 24 Hours of Le Mans in June 1963. The victory was worth almost $20,000 in various prize money along with prestige, and gave Ferrari its fourth consecutive Le Mans victory. 

In 1965, John Surtees and Scarfiotti shared a Ferrari 330 P2 Spyder which gave the marque a fourth consecutive victory at the 1000km Nürburgring race. Scarfiotti and Bandini drove a 2-litre Dino 206 S to second place in the 1966 running of the 1,000 kilometre Nürburgring in which first place went to Phil Hill and Joakim Bonnier driving a 5.4-litre Chevrolet-powered Chaparral. The Dino was 90 seconds behind the Chaparral that debuted the automatic transmission in European competition.

Surtees severed relations with the Ferrari racing team following their decision to replace him with Scarfiotti at the 1966 24 Hours of Le Mans. Scarfiotti would go on to finish 31st, retiring after 123 laps. Scarfiotti joined Mike Parkes in a Ferrari P4 for the 1000 km Spa in May 1967. They finished a lap behind Jacky Ickx and Richard Thompson, who drove a Ford Mirage (race car). The winning team averaged  and posted a time of 5 hours, 9 minutes, 46.5 seconds.

Teamed with Mike Parkes, Scarfiotti took the new Ferrari P4 coupe to second place behind the sister car (a P4 spyder) driven by Lorenzo Bandini and Chris Amon at the 24 Hours of Daytona, with Ferrari taking the first three positions. The same result took place at the Monza 1,000 km in April.  Scarfiotti, again teamed with Parkes finished second at the 24 Hours of Le Mans, this time behind the Ford Mark IV driven by A.J. Foyt and Dan Gurney. Scarfiotti raced a Ferrari factory car in the September 1967 200-mile Canadian-American Challenge Cup race held on a  course near Bridgehampton, New York. His sponsor was the North American Racing Team of Luigi Chinetti.

After Günter Klass was killed in July 1967, Ferrari retired the two-litre Dino 206S prototypes that were also used in hillclimbing. After a fast 1967 24 Hours of Le Mans race won by a 7-litre V8-powered Ford ahead of Scarfiotti/Parkes, the big engines were banned for the 1968 WSC season in which prototypes were limited to max 3-litre engines, same size as in F1, but those were designed to last for 300 km, not 1000 km or 24 hours. Ferrari was forced to retire the 4-litre V12 Ferrari P series, and in protest to the rule change, did not enter the 1968 World Sportscar Championship. With the Germans also being active in hillclimbing, Scarfiotti joined Porsche.

Scarfiotti entered the 1968 Targa Florio, but wrecked his Porsche 907 (#230) on the first day of qualifying and was forced to race with Porsche's T-car which did not last the  road race.

Formula One
Enzo Ferrari signed Scarfiotti to the Ferrari Formula One team of drivers for  along with Surtees, Willy Mairesse, Bandini, and Nino Vaccarella. Scarfiotti placed sixth in the second Ferrari in the 1963 Dutch Grand Prix at Zandvoort. He was a lap behind victor Jim Clark in a Lotus. John Surtees piloted the first Ferrari to third place behind Dan Gurney in a Brabham. Scarfiotti finished fifth in the non-championship 1965 Syracuse Grand Prix on the island of Sicily.

As of the end of the 2021 Formula One season, Scarfiotti is also the last Italian to win it.

Following the death of Bandini from burns sustained during the 1967 Monaco Grand Prix, Ferrari entered two F1 cars for Scarfiotti and Parkes in the non-championship 1967 Syracuse Grand Prix. Scarfiotti drove a 1966 3-litre Ferrari 312 whereas Parkes drove a 1967 with the 1966 nose to accommodate his long frame. They shared the victory when they crossed the finish line in an unusual dead heat. At the GPs of Zandvoort and Spa, both Parkes and Scarfiotti were part of a three-car Scuderia, with a 4-5-6 place finish at the Dutch GP suggesting equal speed of these three drivers, but both Parkes and Scarfiotti were one lap behind Amon, despite Parkes qualifying only 0.1 sec slower than Amon, with Scarfiotti being a full second off pace. At Spa, Parkes hat a career-ending accident, while Scarfiotti was 4 laps behind and not classified. For the rest of the 1967 F1 WC Season, Ferrari entered only one car, for Chris Amon. For his home GP at Monza, the winner of the 1966 event secured a drive in the second All American Racers Eagle Mk1, a quite promising move, as Dan Gurney had won the race at the very fast Spa circuit. However, both Weslake V12 failed early in the race.

With Ferrari hiring Jacky Ickx and Amon for 1968, there was no place for Scarfiotti, who entered F1 races for Cooper instead. Brian Redman and Scarfiotti came in third and fourth respectively at the 1968 Spanish Grand Prix in Jarama, both driving for Cooper. In his final Formula One appearance, Scarfiotti placed fourth in the 1968 Monaco Grand Prix, an event marked by mechanical breakdowns that eliminated 11 of 16 starters before the race was completed.

Death
Ludovico Scarfiotti died in 1968 at a hillclimbing event on the Roßfeldhöhenringstraße near Berchtesgaden, Germany, in the German Alps. He became the third Grand Prix driver to die in 1968, following Jim Clark and Mike Spence. Scarfiotti wrecked his Porsche 910 during trials when the car veered abruptly off the Rossfeldstrasse track and catapulted ten yards down a tree-covered slope. The Porsche hung in the trees and Scarfiotti was thrown from the cockpit. He was discovered, badly injured, fifty yards away. He died in an ambulance of numerous fractures. Huschke von Hanstein, the team manager of Porsche, stated that he had never been associated with a fatal accident during the eighteen years he had been in charge of the team.  of burned rubber braking indicated that Scarfiotti had slammed on his brakes at the final moment.

Scarfiotti was married to Ida Benignetti and had two children from a previous relationship.

Racing record

Complete Formula One World Championship results
(key) (Races in italics indicate fastest lap)

Non-championship Formula One results
(key) (Races in bold indicate pole position)
(Races in italics indicate fastest lap)

Complete 24 Hours of Le Mans results

Complete 12 Hours of Sebring results

Complete 24 Hours of Daytona results

References

External links 
 Biography in GP Encyclopedia
 Roßfeld Historic race website

1933 births
1968 deaths
Sportspeople from Turin
Italian racing drivers
Italian Formula One drivers
Ferrari Formula One drivers
Formula One race winners
Anglo American Racers Formula One drivers
Cooper Formula One drivers
Racing drivers who died while racing
Sport deaths in Germany
24 Hours of Le Mans drivers
24 Hours of Le Mans winning drivers
World Sportscar Championship drivers
12 Hours of Sebring drivers
12 Hours of Reims drivers